Alberte Kielstrup Madsen (born 15 September 2000) is a Danish handball player for Nykøbing Falster Håndboldklub and the Danish national team.

She was selected as part of the Danish 20-player squad for the 2022 European Women's Handball Championship, but was not in action. Madsen also participated at the 2017 European Women's U-17 Handball Championship, placing 6th.

Achievements
Danish League: 
Winner: 2021
Runners-up: 2020
Danish Cup
Winner: 2020
Runners-up: 2019

References

2000 births
Living people
Danish female handball players
People from Assens Municipality